Roderick S. C. Wong (born October 2, 1944) is a mathematician who works in classical analysis.  His research mainly focuses on asymptotic analysis, singular perturbation theory, special functions and orthogonal polynomials, integral transforms, integral equations, and ordinary differential equations. He is currently a chair professor at City University of Hong Kong and director of the Liu Bie Ju Centre for Mathematical Sciences.

Education and career
Wong obtained his BA degree in mathematics from San Diego State College in 1965 and his PhD from the University of Alberta in 1969. He started his career as an assistant professor in the Department of Mathematics at the University of Manitoba and was promoted to full professor in 1979. He received a Killam Research Fellowship (from the Canada Council) from 1982 to 1984 and became a Fellow of the Royal Society of Canada in 1993.  He was appointed the head of the Department of Applied Mathematics in 1986, a post which he held until he left the University of Manitoba in 1994. 
After spending almost 30 years in Canada, Wong returned to Hong Kong and joined City University of Hong Kong in early 1994 to take up the post of professor of mathematics. He was concurrently appointed head of the then newly formed Department of Mathematics. In 1995, he led the efforts for the establishment of the Liu Bie Ju Centre for Mathematical Sciences and was appointed director of the centre. He was appointed to dean of College of Science and Engineering in 1998, and became vice-president (Research & Technology) and dean of graduate studies in 2006. He later took up the position of vice-president for development & external relations and had been very successful in soliciting pledges of funds for the university. He established the William Benter Prize in Applied Mathematics in 2010. Over the years, the award has been getting more and more recognized internationally and has become one of the highly acclaimed accolades in the field of applied mathematics.

Wong has received many awards and honours for his achievements and contribution over the years. He is a Foreign Member of Accademia delle Scienze di Torino in Italy, a member of the European Academy of Sciences, and a Founding Fellow of Hong Kong Institution of Science.  He was awarded the Chevalier dans l’Ordre National de la Légion d’Honneur.

Professional activities 
Chairman, Selection Committee of the William Benter Prize in Applied Mathematics, 2008–present

Books (authored or edited)

References

External links
Liu Bie Centre for Mathematical Sciences
William Benter Prize in Applied Mathematics
 

Canadian mathematicians
Mathematicians from Shanghai
San Diego State University alumni
University of Alberta alumni
Academic staff of the City University of Hong Kong
Academic staff of the University of Manitoba
Academic staff of the Southern University of Science and Technology
Fellows of the Royal Society of Canada
Chevaliers of the Légion d'honneur
1944 births
Living people
Chinese emigrants to Canada
Educators from Shanghai
Chinese science writers
Writers from Shanghai